You're My Thrill may refer to:

 "You're My Thrill" (song), a 1933 popular song written by Jay Gorney and Sidney Clare
 You're My Thrill (Doris Day album), 1949
 You're My Thrill (Shirley Horn album), 2001
 You're My Thrill (Elaine Dame album), 2014